Pheos is a genus of moths in the family Blastobasidae. It contains only one species, Pheos aculeatus, which is found in Costa Rica.

The length of the forewings is 5.9–6.5 mm. The forewings are pale brownish yellow intermixed with a few brown scales. The hindwings are translucent pale brownish yellow, gradually darkening toward the apex.

Etymology
The generic name is derived from Greek pheos (meaning a spiny plant) and refers to the many spinelike setae and spinelike processes of the male valva of the genitalia. The specific name is derived from Latin aculeatus (meaning provided with prickles and stings) and refers to the many spinelike setae and spinelike processes of the valva of the male genitalia.

References

Blastobasidae genera
Monotypic moth genera
Moths of Central America